In Greek mythology, Cephalion (Ancient Greek: Κεφαλίων), also called Caphaurus (Κάφαυρον), was the son of Amphithemis and the nymph Tritonis and the brother of Nasamon.

Mythology 
Cephalion's family lived in Libya and he was a shepherd of whose flocks were plundered by the Argonauts Canthus and Eurybates (Eribotes). These two were later killed by Cephalion in revenge.

References

More bibliography 

 Apollonius Rhodius, Argonautica translated by Robert Cooper Seaton (1853-1915), R. C. Loeb Classical Library Volume 001. London, William Heinemann Ltd, 1912. Online version at the Topos Text Project.
 Apollonius Rhodius, Argonautica. George W. Mooney. London. Longmans, Green. 1912. Greek text available at the Perseus Digital Library.
 Gaius Julius Hyginus, Fabulae from The Myths of Hyginus translated and edited by Mary Grant. University of Kansas Publications in Humanistic Studies. Online version at the Topos Text Project.

Characters in the Argonautica